There are four localities within the county of Cumbria in North West England named Seathwaite:
Seathwaite, Allerdale, a hamlet in Borrowdale
Seathwaite, South Lakeland, a village in the Duddon Valley
Seathwaite Fell, a hill at the head of Borrowdale
Seathwaite Tarn, a lake near the village in the Duddon Valley